Anthony Stargell (born August 7, 1966) is a former professional football cornerback who played eight professional seasons 1990-1997. Stargell attended LaGrange High School and graduated with the class of 1986.

1966 births
Living people
American football cornerbacks
Tennessee State Tigers football players
New York Jets players
Indianapolis Colts players
Tampa Bay Buccaneers players
Kansas City Chiefs players
Chicago Bears players